Åshild Anita Irgens (born 7 February 1976) is a Norwegian illustrator. She has illustrated several children's books for the publishers Aschehoug, Damm, Samlaget and Gyldendal, among them the novel Tonje Glimmerdal by Maria Parr, a recipient of the Brage Prize.

Illustrations
Authors/books Irgens has illustrated for:
 2005: Kjersti Scheen: Øyenvitnet
 2006: Marianne Viermyr: Bølla Britt og Rita Rapp
 2006: Kjersti Scheen: Linnea og kastanjeprinsen
 2007: Rasmus Løland: Gutar
 2007: Rasmus Løland: Kvitebjørnen
 2007: Rita Løvseth Sandnes: Lovise flytter
 2007: Tone Kjærnli: Oldefars øye
 2008: Bjørg Øygarden: Askeladden og de nye hjelperne
 2008: Naja Marie Aidt: Huset
 2008: Rita Løvseth Sandnes: Lovise får en venn
 2009: Camilla Dahle Otterlei: Klara og verdens fineste Pekal
 2009: Hans Sande:  Er du blind i dag, Elise?
 2009: Maria Parr: Tonje Glimmerdal
 2009: Rita Løvseth Sandnes: Lovise og de førti røverne
 2009: Tone Kjærnli: Dummedagen
 2009: Prinsessen som ikke ville leke i Den store hvite prinsesseboka
 2010: Hans Sande: Hopp i havet, Elise!
 2010: Åse Ombustvedt: Jo og Gjedda
 2010: Camilla Dahle Otterlei: Klara og gangsterklubbe
 2010: Mari Sager: Monster-Frida
 2010: Mari Sager: Doktor-Frida
 2010: Signe Olaug Pedersen: Sprett i håret - sug i magen 
 2011: Mari Sager: Stjele-Frida
 2011: Sonya Hartnett: Sølveselet
 2011: Mari Sager: Pannekake-Frida 
 2011: Inger Marie Kjølstadmyr: Henrik og badesvampen - bildebok
 2011: Sigrid Merethe Hanssen: Detektiv Smartbart og sabotasjen på badet
 2011: Karin Kinge Lindboe: Helt på trynet forelska
 2012: René Zografos: Stinke og stanken - bildebok
 2012: Mari Sager: Spion-Frida
 2012: Erna Osland: Hør!
 2013: Mari Sager: Skremme-Frida
 2013: Charlotte Glaser Munch: Kinaputten
 2014: Charlotte Glaser Munch: Monsterbakken
 2014: Birte Svatun: Tenkeboka
 2014: Birgitta Nilsson: Fikenvulkanen
 2014: Laura Djupvik: God dag, herr Jul 
 2014: Mari Kjetun: Kattekameratene
 2015: Ingvild Bjerkeland: Monsterbølger – bildebok
 2015: Mina Lystad: Alfred må lese høyt
 2016: Jørn Roeim: Den store, sprø dyreboka – gjennomillustrert vitsebok
 2016: Ingeborg Eliassen: Snarveien – bildebok
 2016: Johan B. Mjønes: Sov godt, Lukas – bildebok
 2016: Mina Lystad: Helmer og Matilda - Aksjon Bestevenn
 2017: Johan B. Mjønes: Hva gjør du, Lukas – bildebok
 2018: Ingelin Røssland: Stjålet venn
 2018: Johan B. Mjønes: Lukas og spurven – bildebok
 2018: Bjørn Ingvaldsen: Natt

References

Norwegian illustrators
Norwegian children's book illustrators
Norwegian women illustrators
1976 births
Living people